Psallus falleni is a species of plant bug in the family Miridae. It is found in Europe including the north Mediterranean basin then east across the Palearctic to Siberia and China. It occurs as an adventive species in North America.
Psallus falleni lives on birches ( Betula ).  The imagines occur relatively late from July to September

References

Further reading

External links
Psallus falleni images at  Consortium for the Barcode of Life

Phylini
Articles created by Qbugbot
Insects described in 1883